Revolver (also titled Blood in the Streets and In the Name of Love) is a poliziottesco film directed by Sergio Sollima and released in 1973. It stars Oliver Reed and Fabio Testi. The film's theme, "Un Amico", was scored by Ennio Morricone and was also featured in Quentin Tarantino's 2009 film Inglourious Basterds.

Plot 
An Italian prison official's wife is kidnapped, and the kidnappers demand that a notorious prisoner be released in order for the man to get his wife back. He gets the man released - but then kidnaps him himself, in order to ensure that the man's colleagues do not kill his wife. Enraged, the gang sets out to free their compatriot and kill the man who took him.

Cast 

 Oliver Reed as Vito Cipriani
 Fabio Testi as Milo Ruiz
 Agostina Belli as Anna Cipriani
 Paola Pitagora as Carlotta
 Daniel Beretta as Al Niko
 Frédéric de Pasquale as Michel Granier
 Marc Mazza as Bald Police Inspector
 Reinhard Kolldehoff as French Lawyer
 Bernard Giraudeau as  Sicilian Kidnapper
 Peter Berling as Grappa
 Alexander Stephan (as Gunnar Warner) as Jean-Daniel Auger
 Calisto Calisti as Maresciallo Fantuzzi
 Steffen Zacharias as Joe Le Corse
 Michel Bardinet as French Policeman
 Salvatore Borghese as Suicidal Prisoner
 Giovanni Pallavicino as Sicilian Kidnapper
 Marco Mariani as Carlo DeGregori
 Jean Degrave as Harmakolas
 Franco Moraldi as French Police Chief
 Ottavio Fanfani as Shopkeeper
 Gianni Bortolotto as Doctor

Production
Paola Pitagora recalls how Oliver Reed always turned up drunk on set (something confirmed by director Sollima) and as a result there were often difficulties during filming - including an incident in which Reed 'under the influence' crashed a VW bus into a post and Paola Pitagora, who hit her face inside the vehicle, had to wear big sunshades for the rest of the filming to cover up her bruised eyes.

Release
Revolver was released in Italy on September 27, 1973 where it was distributed theatrically by Panta. The film grossed 477,374,000 Italian lire in Italy.

References

Footnotes

Sources

External links

1973 films
1970s crime thriller films
Films directed by Sergio Sollima
Poliziotteschi films
Films scored by Ennio Morricone
West German films
1970s Italian films